Ain Baal is a Lebanese village located in the Caza of Tyre in the South Governorate of Lebanon. The municipality  is member of Federation of Tyr (Sour) District Municipalities.

Origin of name
E. H. Palmer wrote that the name means "Elevated land on which no water falls" or "unwatered vegetation".  He further added that "The word may be connected with the name Baal."

History
In 1875 Victor Guérin found it had 200 Shia inhabitants.

In 1881, the PEF's Survey of Western Palestine (SWP)  described it as: "A stone-built  village, containing 200 Metawileh, built in a valley ; the ground is arable, with groves of figs and olives planted round the village. The water supply is from the spring of 'Ain Ib'al, [..] just north of the village there are also some cisterns.
They further noted that the village had "A perennial spring north of village; good supply of water."

On 28 July 1979 MK Uri Avneri read a statement in Knesset, avoiding Israeli censorship laws, in which he recounted the case of Lieutenant Daniel Pinto who had been convicted of the murder of four villagers from Ain Baal. The incident took place in April 1978, during Operation Litani. It had been revealed in court that he had tortured each of the victims before strangling them. He was sentenced to twenty years in prison. In September 1979 his prison sentence had been reduced to two years by Minister of Defence Raphael Eitan.

About Ain Baal
Ain Baal borders Tyre, Batolay, Bazooreye and Hanaway. Ain Baal is  famous for the Sarcophagus of King Hiram I, King of Tyre, which is located on the borders with Hanaway. The influence of the sarcophagus King Hiram I on this village is very obvious, where you can find schools, convenience stores, barbershops and restaurants named after the king such as the Hiram Elementary School of Ain Baal. Ain Baal is also the home village of the famous Lebanese football midfielder Roda Antar.

References

Bibliography

External links
Survey of Western Palestine, Map 1:  IAA, Wikimedia commons 
 Ain Baal (Sour), Localiban

Populated places in the Israeli security zone 1985–2000
Populated places in Tyre District
Shia Muslim communities in Lebanon